The 21st New York Infantry Regiment ("1st Buffalo Regiment") was an infantry regiment in the Union Army during the American Civil War.

Service
The 21st New York Infantry was organized at Buffalo, New York and mustered in for two years state service on May 8, 1861 and subsequently re-mustered at Elmira, New York for three months federal service under the command of Colonel William Findlay Rogers.

The regiment was attached to Mansfield's Command, Department of Washington, to August 1861. Division of the Potomac to October 1861. Wadsworth's Brigade, McDowell's Division, Army of the Potomac, to March 1862. Patrick's 2nd Brigade, King's 3rd Division, I Corps, Army of the Potomac, to April 1862. 2nd Brigade, King's Division, Department of the Rappahannock, to June 1862. 3rd Brigade, 1st Division, III Corps, Army of Virginia, to September 1862. 3rd Brigade, 1st Division, I Corps, Army of the Potomac, to January 1863. Provost Marshal, General Patrick's Command, Army of the Potomac, to May 1863.

The 21st New York Infantry mustered out of service on May 18, 1863.

Detailed service
Left Elmira, N.Y., for Washington, D. C., June 18. Camp at Kalorama Heights, Washington, D.C., until July 14, 1861. Garrison at Fort Runyon until August 20. Transferred to United States service for balance of state enlistment by order of Governor E. D. Morgan August 2, 1861. Moved to Rip Raps with mutineers August 20–30. Camp at Arlington Heights, Va., until September 28, and at Upton's Hill, Va., until March 1862. Advance on Manassas, Va., March 10–15. Camp at Upton's Hill until April 9. McDowell's advance on Falmouth, Va., April 9–19. Duty at Fredericksburg until May 25. McDowell's advance on Richmond May 25–29. Operations against Jackson June 1–21. At Falmouth until July 28, and at Fredericksburg until August 6. Pope's Campaign in northern Virginia August 16-September 2. Fords of the Rappahannock August 21–23. Sulphur Springs August 26. Gainesville August 28. Groveton August 29. Second Battle of Bull Run August 30. Maryland Campaign September 6–22. Battles of South Mountain September 14; Antietam September 16–17. Duty in Maryland until October 29. Movement to Falmouth, Va., October 29-November 19. Battle of Fredericksburg, Va., December 12–15. Assigned to provost duty at Aquia Creek January to May 1863. Chancellorsville Campaign April 27-May 6.

Casualties
The regiment lost a total of 118 men during service; 2 officers and 74 enlisted men killed or mortally wounded, 2 officers and 40 enlisted men died of disease.

Commanders
 Colonel William Findlay Rogers
 Captain George N. Layton - commanded at the Battle of Fredericksburg

Notable members
 Captain Algar M. Wheeler, Company B - one of only six men to receive the Silver Citation Star for the Civil War Campaign Medal

See also

 List of New York Civil War regiments
 New York in the Civil War

References
 Dyer, Frederick H. A Compendium of the War of the Rebellion (Des Moines, IA:  Dyer Pub. Co.), 1908.
 Mills, John Harrison. Chronicles of the Twenty-First Regiment New York State Volunteers (Buffalo, NY: Gies & Co., Printers and Bookmakers), 1887.
 Nagle, Theodore M. Reminiscences of the Civil War (Erie, PA: Dispatch Ptg. & Eng. Co.), 1923.
 Strong, James Clark. Biographical Sketch of James Clark Strong (Los Gatos, CA: s.n.), 1910.
Attribution
 

Military units and formations established in 1861
Military units and formations disestablished in 1863
Infantry 021
1861 establishments in New York (state)